Agona Abirem is a town in the Komenda Edina Eguafo Abrem (KEEA) Municipality in the Central region of Ghana. The town is known for the Eguafo-Abrem Secondary School. The school is a second cycle institution.

References

Populated places in the Central Region (Ghana)